All of Finland, including Åland, has the same country code, +358.

Finland's numbering plan was reorganised in 1996, with the number of area codes being reduced, and the trunk code being changed from 9 to 0. This meant that the area code for Helsinki also changed:

Geographic area codes

Source: Finnish Communications Regulatory Authority

Non-geographic numbers

Mobile numbers
Finnish mobile numbers start with 04x, 0457 or 050. The format for mobile telephone numbers is 04x 123 45 67 or 0457 123 45 67 or 050 123 45 67. When called from a different country, the format is + 358 4x 123 45 67 or + 358 50 123 45 67. Most commonly 7 digits are used for the subscriber number.

The first three digits previously indicated the mobile operator but mobile number portability has been implemented and any prefix can now be associated with any operator, 040 (was owned by TeliaSonera) and 050 (was owned by Elisa, formerly Radiolinja) are most common prefixes. 042 and 045 0 were also owned by TeliaSonera, whereas 046 was owned by Elisa. Other major networks are DNA Finland (using then 041, 044 and other numbers in the 045 range) and Saunalahti (using numbers in the 045 range). Former operator codes include 043, which was used in DCS "city phones". Some of these may still be in use. The former NMT network numbers used operator code 049. Most NMT numbers were transferred to GSM numbers with format 04x0 123 456 or 0500 123 456, as there were only 6 subscriber numbers in NMT numbers.

The area code for fixed landline subscriptions in Kymi is 05, and should not be confused with mobile numbers starting with 050.

Short numbers 
Upon launching the world's first GSM network in 1991, operator Radiolinja (later merged with Elisa) issued short phone numbers in the format 050 XXXX and 050 XXXXX to their employees and shareholders until the early 2000s. New shareholders purchasing 5000 FIM (about 1101 EUR in 2021) or more worth of shares could request a number. Only 280 four-digit numbers and 6,800 five-digit numbers were issued. Such numbers continue to be in use and can be transferred between operators just like longer numbers.

International access
The default international access code is 00, although when dialing the Telex number, prefix 99 is required.

When dialing from a mobile phone, + (a plus sign) can be used as a substitute for keying in the international access code.

See also
 Telephone numbers in Åland

References

 http://www.viestintavirasto.fi/attachments/muutpaatokset/Suomen_numerointisuunnitelma.pdf
 http://www.itu.int/dms_pub/itu-t/opb/sp/T-SP-E.164D-2016-PDF-E.pdf
 http://www.itu.int/dms_pub/itu-t/opb/sp/T-SP-E.164C-2011-PDF-E.pdf
 http://www.itu.int/dms_pub/itu-t/opb/sp/T-SP-LT.1-2015-PDF-E.pdf
 http://www.wtng.info
 https://www.viestintavirasto.fi/internetpuhelin/puhelinverkonnumerointi.html

Finland
Finland communications-related lists
Telecommunications in Finland